Gemma McGuinness (born 7 August 1995) is an Irish footballer who plays for Women's National League (WNL) club Sligo Rovers. She previously represented Derry City of the Northern Ireland Women's Premiership. A winger or forward, she has also represented the Republic of Ireland at youth level and Northern Ireland at senior level.

Club career
McGuinness is from Moville in County Donegal. At youth level she played soccer for Greencastle FC, as well as for her school Moville Community College. In April 2013 she scored a hat-trick for the latter in their 4–3 FAI Schools Cup final win over Christ King. 

When McGuinness went to Ulster University at Coleraine her football career was disrupted because there was no women's college soccer team. In her final year she began playing again at the University's Jordanstown campus in Belfast.

Having rediscovered her enthusiasm for football McGuinness progressed to playing for Derry City. In her first season with the Candystripes, 2016–17, her 14 goals helped secure promotion back to the Northern Ireland Women's Premiership. In 2019 her football career was disrupted again when she moved to Vietnam to work as a science teacher.

Returning from Vietnam after two years, McGuinness trained with Derry City but instead accepted an offer from newly-formed Women's National League (WNL) club Sligo Rovers. On 19 March 2022 the club secured its first ever competitive win, 2–1 over Cork City at Turners Cross. McGuinness scored the club's first official goal in the match.

International career

Youth
McGuinness represented Ireland at schoolgirl level while she attended Moville Community College. She progressed to playing for the Republic of Ireland women's national under-17 football team, scoring against Romania and hosts North Macedonia as Ireland negotiated the 2012 UEFA Women's Under-17 Championship qualification first round mini tournament in October 2011.

With the Republic of Ireland women's national under-19 football team, McGuinness scored in the opening 2013 UEFA Women's Under-19 Championship first qualifying round fixture, a 3–0 win over Cyprus in Inđija, Serbia, on 20 October 2012. Two days later she scored the final goal in an 11–0 win over Latvia. 

Still eligible for under-19 football the following season, McGuinness was selected for two friendlies against Portugal in September 2013. Although an injury ruled her out of both matches, she recovered to participate in the 2014 UEFA Women's Under-19 Championship qualification series hosted by Ireland later that month.

While enrolled at the University of Ulster, McGuinness represented Ireland at the 2019 Summer Universiade.

Senior
In February 2019 McGuinness was given a first call-up by the Northern Ireland women's national football team for their appearance at the 2019 Turkish Women's Cup later that month. She had attended her first training camp with Northern Ireland the previous month.  

McGuinness won her first senior cap on 5 March 2019, as an 83rd-minute substitute in Northern Ireland's 2–1 win over Uzbekistan which secured third place at the Turkish Women's Cup.

Personal life
As well as being a footballer, McGuinness is a qualified nutritionist. In 2022 she was employed by Davey Nutrition.

References

External links

Gemma McGuinness at Football Association of Ireland (FAI)

1995 births
Living people
Republic of Ireland women's association footballers
Women's association football midfielders
Women's National League (Ireland) players
Northern Ireland women's international footballers
Association footballers from County Donegal
Republic of Ireland women's youth international footballers
Alumni of Ulster University
Sligo Rovers F.C. (women) players
Women nutritionists